Trasviña is a surname. Notable people with the surname include:

 John D. Trasviña (born 1958), American human rights attorney
 Lucía Trasviña Waldenrath, Mexican politician

See also
 Trevena (disambiguation)

Surnames of Mexican origin